The Cool World is a 1964 soundtrack album to the film The Cool World by Dizzy Gillespie and his quintet, composed and arranged by Mal Waldron.

Reception

The Allmusic review by Thom Jurek awarded the album four stars and said that "This set is one of Diz's best records of the 1960s (which is saying something), and one of the best jazz film scores period...Waldron's sense of economy in picking both impressionistic and expressionist avenues for blues to speak through jazz in an inspired quintet like this is remarkable -- the temptation would be to excess at every turn, especially given Waldron's gift for sophisticated harmonies and spacy lyrical concerns...Ultimately, the soundtrack to Cool World is an enormous success artistically, standing head and shoulders over virtually every other such effort of the period, and a welcome addition to the Gillespie catalog, offering a very keen and muscular view of his 1964 band". An AllAboutJazz reviewer commented that the score, "alternately dark and moody and exhilaratingly brisk, is full of short, resonant tracks [...] one of the great jazz film scores."

Track listing
 "Theme from The Cool World" – 5:17
 "The Pushers" – 2:34
 "Enter, Priest" – 4:11
 "Duke's Awakening" – 2:43
 "Duke on the Run" – 5:16
 "Street Music" – 2:34
 "Bonnie's Blues" – 4:00
 "Coney Island" – 3:43
 "Duke's Fantasy" – 2:16
 "Coolie" – 3:39
 "Duke's Last Soliloquy" – 3:04

All music composed by Mal Waldron.

Personnel

Performance
Dizzy Gillespie – trumpet
James Moody - flute, tenor saxophone
Kenny Barron – piano
Chris White – double bass
Rudy Collins – drums

Mal Waldron – composer, arranger
Nat Hentoff – liner notes

References 

1964 soundtrack albums
Dizzy Gillespie soundtracks
Jazz soundtracks
Albums arranged by Mal Waldron
Philips Records soundtracks